The Flintstones: Bedrock Bowling is a Bowling game developed by Adrenalin Interactive and published by SouthPeak Interactive (In Europe, the game was co-published by Ubi Soft) which was released in Europe and North America in 2000. The game is only available on PlayStation in North America however in Europe it is available on both PlayStation and Windows.

Gameplay
The characters are in a giant hollowed out bowling ball, controlling it while trying to knock the pins spread throughout level. The player has to avoid obstacles without extra frames to try again. All in one shot they must knock all the pins down.

Cast
Henry Corden as Fred Flintstone

Frank Welker as Barney Rubble

John Stephenson as Mr. Slate

Harvey Korman as The Great Gazoo

Russi Taylor as Pebbles Flintstone

Reception

The PlayStation version received unfavorable reviews according to the review aggregation website GameRankings. Jeff Lundrigan of NextGen said that the game was "So bad, we're tempted to buy up copies just to protect some unsuspecting child from picking it up." GamePro gave it a mixed review, and GameRevolution gave it an overwhelming dislike, over a month before the game was released Stateside.

References

External links
 
 

2000 video games
Bowling video games
PlayStation (console) games
SouthPeak Games
Ubisoft games
Video games developed in the United States
Windows games
Video games based on The Flintstones
Warner Bros. video games
Single-player video games